Jovan Mijatović (born 11 July 2005) is a Serbian professional footballer who plays as a winger for Red Star Belgrade.

Club career 
Mijatović went through the junior selections of Red Star Belgrade. At the beginning of the spring of 2021, he suffered a serious knee injury, which caused him to be absent from the field in the following period. With the cadet team, he participated in winning the title for the 2021/22 season, while occasionally playing for the youth team. At the beginning of the competition 2022/23. Mijatović played for Grafičar, where he scored five goals in eight games in the Serbian First League. At the end of the summer transfer window of the same year, he was returned to his parent club and joined the first team. He take the number 9 jersey previously worn by  Milan Pavkov.

International career

Youth
In 2019, Mijatović played for the Serbian under-15 national team. He scored a goal at the opening of the Trofej Crna Gora tournament in Podgorica,  against the corresponding team of Slovenia. He also made his debut for the under-16 team at a friendly match with his peers from Romania in March 2021. Soon after that, he suffered an injury that kept him off the field for a long time
. So he joined the Serbia national under-17 football team a year later, performing at a friendly match with Bosnia and Herzegovina. He participated in the European Championship for cadets, where the selection of Serbia under the leadership of Radovan Krivokapić achieved third place. The selector of the Serbia national under-19 football team, Jovan Damjanović, sent an invitation to Mijatović for the "Stevan Ćele Vilotić" Memorial Tournament in September 2022.

References

External links
 
 

Serbian First League players
Association football forwards
RFK Grafičar Beograd players
Red Star Belgrade footballers
Footballers from Belgrade
Serbian footballers
2005 births
Living people